Jules Eugène Louis Jouvet (24 December 1887 – 16 August 1951) was a French actor, theatre director and filmmaker.

Early life 
Jouvet was born in Crozon. He had a stutter as a young man and originally trained as a pharmacist. He received an advanced degree in pharmacy in 1913, though he never actually practiced, instead pursuing a career in theatre.:91

Career 
Jouvet was 'refused three times by the Conservatoire' in Paris before being accepted to Jacques Copeau's Théâtre du Vieux-Colombier as a stage manager in 1913.:345 Copeau's training included a varied and demanding schedule, regular exercise for agility and stamina, and pressing his cast and crew to invent theatrical effects in a bare-bones space. It was there Jouvet developed his considerable stagecraft skills, particularly makeup and lighting (he developed a kind of accent light named the jouvet). These years included a successful tour to the United States.

While influential, Copeau's theater was never lucrative and Jouvet left in October 1922 for the Comédie des Champs-Élysées (the small stage of the Théâtre des Champs-Élysées). He was made director of the theatre in 1924. In December 1923 he staged his single most successful production, the satire Dr. Knock, written by Jules Romains.:92 His characterization of the manipulative crank doctor was informed by his own experience in pharmacy school. It became his signature and his standby; he produced it 'almost every year until the end of his life'. Jouvet remained at the Comédie until 1934, when he moved to the Théâtre de l'Athénée due to the high overhead of running a theatre troupe at the Comédie.:92 He served as director of the Théâtre from 1934 through his death in 1951.:92

In 1927, he formed Le Cartel des Quatre [The Cartel of Four] with Charles Dullin, Gaston Baty (1885–1952), and Georges Pitoëff.:80 The Cartel was 'an artistic and economic alliance in opposition to academic and commercial theatre',:178 and the directors did not share a specific 'aesthetic movement'.:80

In 1928 he began an ongoing collaboration with playwright Jean Giraudoux, beginning with a radical streamlining of Giraudoux's Siegfried et le Limousin (1922). Their work together included the first staging of The Madwoman of Chaillot in 1945.

Jouvet starred in some 34 films, including two recordings of Dr. Knock, once in 1933 and again in 1951. He was professor at the French National Academy of Dramatic Arts.

Death 
He died 16 August 1951 in his dressing room at the Théâtre de l'Athénée after having a heart attack. Jouvet is buried in the Montmartre Cemetery in Paris. The Athénée theatre now bears his name.:92

Relatives 
French-Argentine actor Maurice Jouvet (1923–1999) was his nephew.

British actor Peter Wyngarde has claimed Jouvet as his maternal uncle, but Jouvet's immediate family tree does not confirm this.

Legacy 
Pixar paid homage to Jouvet by basing the appearance of the character Anton Ego in Ratatouille (2007) on him.

Theatre 
 1931: original production of Judith, written by Jean Giraudoux, at the Théâtre Pigalle
 1935: original production of The Trojan War Will Not Take Place, written by Jean Giraudoux, starring Jouvet as Homer, also starring Madeleine Ozeray, at the Athénée in Paris
 1947: directed the première of Jean Genet's The Maids at the Athénée in Paris on 17 April.
 1951: directed the première of Jean-Paul Sartre's The Devil and the Good Lord at the Théâtre-Antoine in Paris on 7 June.

Partial filmography 

 Topaze (1933) – Albert Topaze
 Knock, ou le triomphe de la médecine (1935) – Dr. Knock
 La Kermesse Heroique (1935) – Le chapelain / The Priest
 Compliments of Mister Flow (1936) – Achille Durin / Mr. Flow
 Les Bas Fonds (1936) – Le baron
 Street of Shadows (1937) – Le commandant Simonis
 Life Dances On (1937) – Pierre Verdier, dit Jo
 Drole de Drame (1937) – Archibald Soper
 The Cheat (1937) – Valfar
 The Alibi (1937) – Le commissaire Calas
 La Marseillaise (1938) – Roederer, le procureur du département
 Ramuntcho (1938) – Itchoua
 La Maison du Maltais (1938) – Rossignol
 The Shanghai Drama (1938) – L'aventurier Ivan
 The Curtain Rises (1938) – Le professeur Lambertin
 Éducation de prince (1938) – René Cercleux
 Hôtel du Nord (1938) – Monsieur Edmond
 La Fin du jour (1939) – Raphaël Saint Clair
 The Phantom Carriage (1939) – Georges
 Serenade (1940) – Le baron Hartmann
 L'école des femmes (1940)
 Volpone (1941) – Mosca
 Immortal France (1943) – Pierre Froment / Félix Froment
 Un revenant (1946) – Jean-Jacques Sauvage
 Copie conforme (1947) – Manuel Ismora – un cambrioleur de grande envergure / Gabriel Dupon – son sosie, un brave homme / Le duc de Niolles / Le déménageur / Le Norvégien
 Quai des Orfèvres (1947) – L'inspecteur adjoint Antoine
 Monelle (1948) – Gérard Favier
 Between Eleven and Midnight (1949) – L'inspecteur Carrel
 Return to Life (1949) – Jean Girard (segment 3 : "Le retour de Jean")
 Miquette (1950) – Monchablon
 Lady Paname (1950) – Gambier, dit Bagnolet – un photographe anarchiste
 Dr. Knock (1951) – Docteur Knock
 Une histoire d'amour (1951) – L'inspecteur Ernest Plonche (final film role)

References

External links 

 
 
 
 Full text of English-language Jouvet biography online

1887 births
1951 deaths
French male stage actors
French theatre directors
French military personnel of World War I
Officiers of the Légion d'honneur
Burials at Montmartre Cemetery
French male film actors
People from Finistère
20th-century French male actors